Blaengwrach is a community near Glynneath and Resolven in the county borough of Neath Port Talbot, Wales. It is also the name of an electoral ward of Neath Port Talbot county borough, which is a larger area than the Community. The principal settlement is Cwmgwrach, a village on the south side of the Neath valley, of which the eastern end is called Blaengwrach, which sometimes causes confusion.

Geography
Blaengwrach Community is a predominantly upland area, and contains the highest points of three local hills or mountains, namely Mynydd Resolfen (383m/1257 ft) and the more prominent Mynydd Pen-y-Cae (573m/1880 ft) and Craig-y-Llyn (600m/1970 ft), both of which have views of the valley below and the Brecon Beacons in the distance. Craig-y-Llyn is the highest point in the old county of Glamorgan, and is home to a nature reserve containing Llyn Fach and a Site of Special Scientific Interest. West of the summit is Foel Chwern round cairn.

Settlement
The villages of Cwmgwrach and Blaengwrach are on the upper reaches of the Neath Valley, and occupy the strip of lowland south of the River Neath, and up the lower slopes of the hillside around the Nant Gwrach stream. The ward had a population of 1,985 in the 2001 census, but 837 were residents of the neighbouring community of Glynneath, so the population of the Blaengwrach community was 1,148. The ward population changed very little at the census of 2011.

The settlement of Blaengwrach is sometimes confused with the village of Cwmgwrach, the name that is used for both the village as a whole, and the western settlement. Traditionally, the stream is the dividing line. The Community Council describe Cwmgwrach, as being a village that 'is actually a combination of Blaengwrach and Cwmgwrach'. A history of the village (Cwmgwrach: Valley of the Witch) was written by Ian Currie, published in 2000.

The village itself was once an active commercial centre, servicing the coalmines, but now contains one shop, a single pub and a rugby union club, Cwmgwrach RFC. Other community facilities include Blaengwrach Primary School, St Mary's Church in Wales, the 13th Afannedd (Cwmgwrach) Scout group, and the Welfare Hall. For wider services the village is largely dependent upon Glynneath.

On the western edge of Cwmgwrach are the ruins of Venallt Ironworks constructed around 1839-42. Iron was smelted here using anthracite coal using the recently developed hot blast method until the closure of the works in 1854.  Most of the remains on land owned by Natural Resources Wales are now a scheduled monument and open to the public.

Transport
The Neath and Tennant Canal once reached to Glyn-neath, and has been restored to provide over four miles of walkable towpath between Resolven and Glynneath. The Vale of Neath Railway was built by Isambard Kingdom Brunel to carry coal to Swansea docks, and is still used for freight  trains transporting coal from the Unity open cast mine at the north-east edge of the village. In 1996 the single-carriageway road along the length of the Neath valley was replaced with a major dual-carriageway, carrying the A465 trunk road from Llandarcy (near Neath) to Hirwaun in Rhondda Cynon Taf, which transformed the access along the Neath valley.

Government and politics
Blaengwrach is in the parliamentary constituency of Neath.

For elections to Neath Port Talbot County Borough Council, Blaengarwch is covered by the 'Blaengarwch and Glynneath West' electoral ward, which also covers the west part of the Glynneath community (though not the village of Glynneath). The ward elects one councillor.

The former ward of Blaengwrach included part or all of the villages of Blaengwrach and Cwmgwrach, as well as Glynneath town. 

In the 2017 local council elections, the Blaengwrach results were:

In the 2012 local council elections, the electorate turnout was 
42.28%.  The Blaengwrach results were:

Film
In 2014, a film called 'Valley of the Witch', was released, set in Cwmgwrach, and with substantial on location filming. A low-budget indie horror/witchcraft film, it was written and directed by Andrew Jones, and released to DVD in 2015 under the title 'Conjuring the Dead'.

References

External links
www.geograph.co.uk Photos of Blaengwrach and surrounding area
Cwmgwrach Public Cemetery transcripts and images
St. Mary's Church, Blaengwrach, transcripts and images

Vale of Neath
Villages in Neath Port Talbot
Former wards of Neath Port Talbot
Communities in Neath Port Talbot